Howth DART station, is a railway station in Fingal, Ireland that serves Howth village and one side of Howth Head.

History
The station opened on 30 May 1847. The Howth tram ran between here and Sutton railway station (all the way around Howth Head) until 1959. Within the station buildings (although not accessible from the platforms) are a bar and restaurant and a convenience store.

Operations
Howth is a two-platform terminal station.  Due to the lack of a run-round or turntable facility, on the rare occasion that a locomotive-hauled train arrives (such as on a railtour), a second locomotive must follow the train light engine from Dublin to haul the train back from Howth.

The ticket office is open from 05:45-00:30 AM, Monday to Sunday.

Gallery

See also
 List of railway stations in Ireland

References

External links
  Irish Rail Howth Station website
 Eiretrains - Howth Station

1847 establishments in Ireland
Railway Station
Iarnród Éireann stations in Fingal
Railway stations in Fingal
Railway stations opened in 1847
Buildings listed on the Fingal Record of Protected Structures
Railway stations in the Republic of Ireland opened in 1847